Arindam Roy is an actor who works predominately in Odia cinema apart from a few Bengali films.

Career 
Arindam Roy changed his stage name to Rishi before changing it back to his original name. Regarding his performance in the film Target Kolkata, a critic wrote that "Arindam Roy acted well, but if he wants to make a future in Tollywood, he needs to work on his Bengali diction". His Odia film Babu Bhaijaan was the last film before COVID19 pandemic which was one of the all time superhit blockbuster film of ollywood.

Selected filmography

Awards and nominations 
2006: Won Odisha State Film Award for Best Supporting Actor for Prema Rutu Asilare (2006)
2014: Nominated for Filmfare Award for Best Actor (Oriya) for Ashok Samrat (2013)

References

External links 

Living people
Indian male film actors
Male actors in Odia cinema
Year of birth missing (living people)